Unexpected Father is a 1939 American comedy drama film directed by Charles Lamont and starring Baby Sandy, Shirley Ross and Dennis O'Keefe.

Plot
When a former dancing partner is killed, an entertainer looks after his baby son with the help of his girlfriend and roommate.

Partial cast
 Baby Sandy as Sandy  
 Shirley Ross as Dianna Donovan  
 Dennis O'Keefe as Jimmy Hanley  
 Mischa Auer as Boris Bebenko  
 Joy Hodges as Peg 
 Dorothy Arnold as Sally  
 Anne Gwynne as Kitty  
 Anne Nagel as Beulah  
 Donald Briggs as Allen Rand, theatre manager  
 Richard Lane as Leo Murphy, Booking Agent  
 Paul Guilfoyle as Ed Stone, Sandy's Uncle  
 Mayo Methot as Ethel Stone  
 Jane Darwell as Mrs. Callahan  
 Spencer Charters as Magistrate

References

Bibliography
 Rowan, Terry. World War II Goes to the Movies & Television Guide.

External links
 

1939 films
1939 comedy-drama films
American comedy-drama films
Films directed by Charles Lamont
Universal Pictures films
American black-and-white films
1930s English-language films
1930s American films
English-language comedy-drama films